Automator is an application developed by Apple Inc for macOS used to create workflows for automating repetitive tasks into batches for quicker alteration via point-and-click (or drag and drop). This saves time and effort over human intervention to manually change each file separately. Automator enables the repetition of tasks across a wide variety of programs, including Finder, Safari, Calendar, Contacts and others. It can also work with third-party applications such as Microsoft Office, Adobe Photoshop or Pixelmator. The icon features a robot holding a pipe, a reference to pipelines, a computer science term for connected data workflows. Automator was first released with Mac OS X Tiger (10.4).

Interface 
Automator provides a graphical user interface for automating tasks without knowledge of programming or scripting languages. Tasks can be recorded as they are performed by the user or can be selected from a list. The output of the previous action can become the input to the next action.

The icon for Automator features a robot, known as Otto the Automator.

Features 
Automator comes with a library of Actions (file renaming, finding linked images, creating a new mail message, etc.) that act as individual steps in a Workflow document. A Workflow document is used to carry out repetitive tasks. Workflows can be saved and reused. Unix command line scripts and AppleScripts can also be invoked as Actions. The actions are linked together in a Workflow. The Workflow can be saved as an application, Workflow file or a contextual menu item. Options can be set when the Workflow is created or when the Workflow is run. A workflow file created in Automator is saved in /Users/{User Name}/Library/Services.

Automator workflows are run sequentially, with each action being given the previous action's output, which it can then process or act upon. Variables can be specified, which can be modified or processed by subsequent actions. Workflows can also incorporate loops and variables. 

, Microsoft bundled Automator actions with Microsoft Office, which could be used to automate Outlook, Word, Excel, or PowerPoint.

The following is a non-exhaustive list of Automator's features:

 General
 Simulate the pressing of any key on the keyboard at specified intervals
 Run AppleScript, Python, Ruby scripts, or shell scripts
 Create Folder Actions, a Finder feature that applies certain workflows to all files in a folder
 Create Services, which can be started in the Services menu
 Automator can integrate with iCal, to launch workflows at an iCal event's specified time and date (and the event can be set to repeat automatically)
 Automator can also launch workflows with programmable voice commands (called Dictation Commands, added in OS X Yosemite)
 Internet
 Download webpages as PDF
 Extract an RSS feed from a given URL, and extract article text contents from that feed
 Compose new emails, with specified subject line and attachments (which can be an output from a previous Action)
 Upload files to FTP servers
 Multimedia
 Control USB-connected cameras to take pictures at regular intervals
 Perform Finder actions on images, including rotation, applying Quartz filters (like black & white), and converting audio and video files to different formats
 Batch resize photos
 Import audio files to iTunes, and add them to playlists
 Play an iTunes playlist
 Text and documents
 Turn text files to audio files, using the Mac's built-in text-to-speech feature
 Extract text from PDF files
 Combine PDF documents
 Extract annotations from PDFs
 Move files across folders, into folders, or out of subfolders
 Process strings text, including adding quotations around text or outputting word count
 Print files; and when combined with the "Get Folder Contents" action, it can print all files in a "drop box" folder

History 
Starting in macOS Monterey, Automator exists alongside Shortcuts.

See also 
 AppleScript
 AutoHotkey

References

External links 
Apple's official Automator page
Apple's official Automator developer documentation
Automator.us, a site with examples and tools, by Sal Soghoian (AppleScript Product Manager at Apple) and others
Automator.us for Mac OS X Leopard (10.5) and newer 
Automator.us for Mac OS X Tiger (10.4)

MacOS
Automation software
Proprietary software
Visual programming languages
2005 software